Joscelin of Courtenay may refer to:
Joscelin I, Lord of Courtenay (died after 1065)
Joscelin I, Count of Edessa (died 1131), son of prec.
Joscelin II, Count of Edessa (died 1159), son of prec.
Joscelin III, Count of Edessa (died after 1190), son of prec.